American country pop duo Dan + Shay have released four studio albums and 14 singles. They have achieved nine top ten hits on the Billboard Country Airplay chart, including seven number one songs. Since the release of "Tequila" in 2018, they have experienced crossover success, placing three singles, including "Tequila", in the top ten of the Adult Pop Songs chart in addition to their success in the country genre.

Studio albums

Singles

As lead artist

Promotional singles

Other charted songs

Other appearances

Music videos

Notes

References

External links
 
 Dan + Shay discography at Discogs

Discographies of American artists
Country music discographies